Tachina latianulum is a species in the family Tachinidae ("bristle flies"), in the order Diptera ("flies").
Tachina latianulum is found in North America.

References

Further reading
 
 O'Hara, James E., and D. Monty Wood (2004). Catalogue of the Tachinidae (Diptera) of America North of Mexico. Memoirs on Entomology, International, vol. 18, 410.
 Taxonomic and host catalogue of the Tachinidae of America North of Mexico

External links

latianulum